William Mart Laanemäe (born in 1959 in Vancouver, Canada) is an Estonian diplomat.

Since 1999 he has worked for Estonian Ministry of Foreign Affairs.

Diplomatic posts
 1999-2003 Ambassador to Austria, Slovakia, Slovenia, Switzerland. 1999-2001 also Ambassador to Hungary and the Czech Republic
 2004-2008 non-resident ambassador to Serbia and Montenegro
 2008-2012 Ambassador to Germany
 2016-2019 Ambassador to Germany

In 2007 he was awarded with Order of the White Star, IV class.

References

Living people
1959 births
Estonian diplomats
Ambassadors of Estonia to Austria
Ambassadors of Estonia to the Czech Republic
Ambassadors of Estonia to Germany
Ambassadors of Estonia to Hungary
Ambassadors of Estonia to Montenegro
Ministers of Foreign Affairs of Estonia
Recipients of the Order of the White Star, 4th Class